Legnica is a Polish parliamentary constituency in the Lower Silesian Voivodeship.  It elects twelve members of the Sejm and three members of the Senate.

The district has the number '1' and is named after the city of Legnica.  It includes the counties of Bolesławiec, Głogów County, Jawor, Jelenia Góra, Kamienna Góra, Legnica, Lubań, Lubin, Lwówek Śląski, Polkowice, Zgorzelec, and Złotoryja, and the city counties of Jelenia Góra and Legnica.

In its current form was created in 2001.

List of members

Sejm

Footnotes

Electoral districts of Poland
Lower Silesian Voivodeship
Legnica